Gaurihar State was a princely state in India, ruling a territory that is now in Madhya Pradesh. Gaurihar is a tehsil of Chhatarpur district.

History
This family is descended from Raja Ram Tiwari, who was Governor of a fort in the service of Guman Singh , ancestor of the Maharajas of Ajaigarh . During the anarchy of the times , Raja Ram rebelled and for a short while held the fort successfully against Ali Bahadur I Gaurihar was Jujhautiya Brahmin Tiwari ruling state. Gaurihar state was founded in 1807 after a split from Ajaigarh State. Pratap Singh Judev signed the accession to the Indian Union on 1 January 1950. Maharaja Chandra Bhan Singh Judev was the last ruler of Gaurihar state.

Rulers 
The rulers bore the title 'Sardar Sawai' and from 1859 the title 'Rao'.
1807 – 1846                Raja Ram                           (d. 1846)
1846 – 1877                Rajdhar Rudra Pratap               (b. 1811 – d. 18..)
1880 – 14 November 1887    Gajadhar Prasad                    (d. 1887)
1888 – 1904                Shamle Prasad                      (b. 1859 – d. 1904)
1904 – 1932                Pratipal (Prithvipal) Singh        (b. 1886 – d. 19..)
1932 – 1944                Avadhendra Pratap Singh            (b. 1902 – d. 19..)
1944 – 1959                Pratap Singh Judev                (b.1923    d.1959)
1959 – 1972                Chandrabhan Singh Judev           (b.1925   d. 2012)

References

External links
Gaurihar (Princely State)

Chhatarpur district
Princely states of Madhya Pradesh
Tehsils of India
1950 disestablishments in India